Herrmann-Debroux is a Brussels Metro station located in the municipality of Auderghem, serving as the eastern terminus of line 5. The station was opened in 1985. It is named after the Belgian politician and former Mayor of Auderghem, Carl Herrmann-Debroux.

Artworks
Herrmann-Debroux currently hosts three artworks from 1985; a painting named "The fall of Troy" by Jan Cox themed after the Iliad, a sculpture named L'Aviateur by Roel D’Haese on the arrival side, and a sculpture named "Ode aan een bergrivier" by Rik Poot on the departure side.

References

External links

Brussels metro stations
Railway stations opened in 1985
Auderghem
1985 establishments in Belgium